The Cheleleka is a river of central Ethiopia.

See also 
 List of rivers of Ethiopia

References 

Rivers of Ethiopia